Palembang Bank Sumsel Babel is a men's volleyball team based in Palembang, South Sumatera, Indonesia. The team plays in Proliga. They had represented Indonesia in AVC Club Championships in 2011.

Honours
Proliga
Champions (3): 2011, 2012, 2013

Indonesian volleyball clubs
Volleyball clubs established in 2002